The Wellington (City of Wellington's Own) and Hawke's Bay Regiment was a Territorial Force regiment of the New Zealand Army. It was formed in 1964 during the reorganisation of the army by the amalgamation of two separate regiments:
Wellington Regiment (City of Wellington's Own)
Hawke's Bay Regiment (which had earlier incorporated the Ruahine Regiment)

This amalgamation saw the new regiment become a TF battalion of the Royal New Zealand Infantry Regiment. This was until the later reorganisation of 1999, which saw the TF battalions split from the RNZIR to become multi-function battalion groups. The Wellington and Hawke's Bay Regiment became the 7th Wellington and Hawke's Bay Battalion Group, with the following unit types:
Infantry
 Alpha Company, was based in Gisborne
 Bravo Company, was based at Trentham Camp in Wellington
 Charlie Company, was based in Napier
Artillery – There was some discussion of converting 22(D) Battery, RNZA in the Wellington region into an Air Defence sub-unit
Medical – Now under the command of 2nd Health Services Battalion (2HSB) in Linton
Logistics
Military Band

In December 2012 the regiment was amalgamated with the 5th Wellington West Coast Taranaki Battalion Group to form the 5/7 Battalion, Royal New Zealand Infantry Regiment (5/7 RNZIR).

Battle honours
The following battle honours were authorised to be emblazoned on the colours:
South Africa 1900–02
First World War: Somme 1916–18, Messines 1917, Ypres 1917, Bapaume 1918, Hindenburg Line, Sambre (Le Quesnoy), Landing at ANZAC, France and Flanders 1916–18, Chunuk Bair, Sari Bair, Gallipoli 1915
Second World War: Greece 1941, Crete, Tobruk 1941, Minquar Qaim, El Alamein, Tebaga Gap, The Sangro, Cassino I, The Senio, Solomons 1942–44

Alliances
 – The Highlanders
 – The Duke of Lancaster's Regiment (King's Lancashire and Border)
 – The Lincoln and Welland Regiment

Freedoms
The regiment was granted the following freedoms:
City of Wellington (1938)
City of Napier (1957)
City of Gisborne (1979)

References

External links
 
 7th Battalion Band

Infantry regiments of New Zealand
Military units and formations established in 1964